The 2020 Rally New Zealand (also known as the Rally New Zealand 2020) was a motor racing event for rally cars that was scheduled to be held over four days between 3 and 6 September 2020, but was cancelled due to the COVID-19 pandemic. It was set to mark the forty-fifth running of Rally New Zealand and planned to be the ninth round of the 2020 World Rally Championship, World Rally Championship-2 and World Rally Championship-3. The 2020 event was scheduled to be based in Auckland in Auckland Region.

Sébastien Loeb and Daniel Elena were the overall reigning rally winners. Citroën Total World Rally Team, the team they drove for in 2012, when Rally New Zealand held a World Rally Championship event last time, were the defending manufacturers' winners.

Background

Preparation and cancellation

The rally had been planned to be the mark of Rally New Zealand after an eight-year absence from the championship, sharing a spot with Rally Australia in the WRC calendar since . However, concerns regarding whether the rally should be held were raised in response to the COVID-19 pandemic.

References

External links
   
 2020 Rally New Zealand at ewrc-results.com
 The official website of the World Rally Championship

2020 in New Zealand motorsport
New Zealand
2020
New Zealand